Bubaline alphaherpesvirus 1 (BuHV-1) is a species of virus in the genus Varicellovirus, subfamily Alphaherpesvirinae, family Herpesviridae, and order Herpesvirales.

References 

Alphaherpesvirinae